Paraepepeotes is a genus of longhorn beetles of the subfamily Lamiinae, containing the following species:

 Paraepepeotes affinis Breuning, 1938
 Paraepepeotes albomaculatus (Gahan, 1888)
 Paraepepeotes breuningi (Pic, 1935)
 Paraepepeotes gigas (Aurivillius, 1897)
 Paraepepeotes guttatus (Guérin-Ménéville, 1844)
 Paraepepeotes isabellinoides Breuning, 1960
 Paraepepeotes marmoratus (Pic, 1925)
 Paraepepeotes szetschuanicus Breuning, 1969
 Paraepepeotes togatus (Perroud, 1855)
 Paraepepeotes websteri (Jordan, 1898)
 Paraepepeotes westwoodii (Westwood, 1848)

References

Lamiini